Irina Reyn is a Russian-born American novelist. Her novel, What Happened to Anna K., was selected as the tenth best fiction book of 2008 by Jennifer Reese of Entertainment Weekly, and won the 2009 Goldberg Prize for Jewish Fiction by emerging writers.

Reyn was born in Moscow, Russia. She is an assistant professor of English at the University of Pittsburgh.

Works
 What Happened to Anna K. (New York: Touchstone/Simon & Schuster, 2008)
 Living on the Edge of the World: New Jersey Writers Take on the Garden State (editor) (New York: Touchstone/Simon & Schuster, 2007)
 The Imperial Wife: A Novel, (New York: St. Martin's Press, 2016)
Mother Country (New York: St. Martin's Press, 2019)

Sources

External links

1974 births
Living people
21st-century American novelists
American women novelists
Writers from Pittsburgh
University of Pittsburgh faculty
American people of Russian-Jewish descent
Russian Jews
Jewish American novelists
21st-century American women writers
Novelists from Pennsylvania
Russian emigrants to the United States
American women academics
21st-century American Jews